Rufino Rodríguez de la Torre (born 2 December 1902, date of death unknown) was an Argentine sailor. He won a silver medal in the 6 metre class at the 1948 Summer Olympics.

References

External links
 

1902 births
Year of death missing
Argentine male sailors (sport)
Olympic medalists in sailing
Olympic sailors of Argentina
Olympic silver medalists for Argentina
Medalists at the 1948 Summer Olympics
Sailors at the 1936 Summer Olympics – 8 Metre
Sailors at the 1948 Summer Olympics – 6 Metre
Sailors at the 1952 Summer Olympics – 6 Metre